Émilie Loit (born 9 June 1979) is a retired tennis player from France.

Besides her three career singles titles, all on clay, included Estoril and Casablanca both in 2004, and Acapulco in 2007, she won 16 doubles titles on the WTA Tour. Her highest rankings were No. 27 in singles and No. 15 in doubles.

On 24 May 2009, right after losing her first-round match at the French Open, she announced her retiring from professional tennis by the end of the tournament.

In summer 2011, she gave birth to a son, Mathias.

WTA career finals

Singles: 3 (3 titles)

Doubles: 26 (16 titles, 10 runner-ups)

ITF Circuit finals

Singles: 12 (7–5)

Doubles: 11 (5-6)

References

External links
 
 
 

1979 births
Living people
French female tennis players
Sportspeople from Manche